Claudia Conte Martínez (born 14 November 1999) is a Spanish heptathlete. She won a silver medal at the 2021 European U23 Championships.

International competitions

Personal bests
Outdoor
200 metres – 24.77 (+1.5 m/s, Eugene 2022)
800 metres – 2:09.93 (Arona 2021)
100 metres hurdles – 13.65 (+1.4 m/s, Eugene 2022)
High jump – 1.88 (Arona 2021)
Long jump – 6.33 (+0.5 m/s, Castellón 2022)
Shot put – 12.99 (Arona 2022)
Javelin throw – 49.89 (Getafe 2021)
Heptathlon – 6194 (Eugene 2022) 
Indoor
800 metres – 2:12.73 (Aubiére 2022)
60 metres hurdles – 8.59 (Ourense 2022)
High jump – 1.83 (Belgrade 2022)
Long jump – 6.13 (Belgrade 2022)
Shot put – 12.73 (Belgrade 2022)
Pentathlon – 4499 (Belgrade 2022)

References

1999 births
Living people
Spanish heptathletes
20th-century Spanish women
21st-century Spanish women